Blankenfelde-Mahlow is a municipality in the Teltow-Fläming district of Brandenburg, Germany.

History

The municipality shared its borders with the former West Berlin, and so during the period 1961-1990 it was separated.

Blankenfelde 
Blankenfelde was first mentioned in documents in 1375. However, a substantial part of this district, the so-called Gagfah settlement, did not develop until the 1930s, after the Süd-Berlin Bodenaktiengesellschaft had acquired and parceled out the area. As a result, the population increased significantly - from 766 inhabitants in 1930 to 6228 inhabitants in 1939.

Mahlow 
Mahlow was first mentioned in documents in 1287. After the place had received a station in 1875, the immigration of wealthy Berliners. Its constituency is under Teltow from 1945 until its dissolution in 1952. As early as 1950, the community Glasow was merged with the community Mahlow. The construction of the Berlin Wall from 13 August 1961, the S-Bahn links were cut to Berlin. Only after the fall of the Wall in 1989 did these connections get going again. On 31 August 1992, the S-Bahn connection was restored with the gap closing the Dresden railway between Lichtenrade and Mahlow.

Demography

Transport
Blankenfelde-Mahlow is located on the federal highway B 96 between the Berlin state border (district Tempelhof-Schöneberg) and Zossen, the state road L 40 between Potsdam and King Wusterhausen and the L 76 to Teltow. The nearest motorway junction is Rangsdorf on the Federal Highway 10 (southern Berliner Ring).

Since 1992, Blankenfelde-Mahlow is with the stations Mahlow and Blankenfelde (Kr Teltow-Fläming) again with the S-Bahn line 2 from Berlin on the Dresden train, after this originally to Rangsdorf going connection in 1961 in the course of the construction of the Berlin Wall and separated was set. Terminus is now Blankenfelde.

With the regional train you can reach Blankenfelde and Dahlewitz via the Regional Express lines RE 5 Rostock / Stralsund-Berlin-Elsterwerda / Wünsdorf-Waldstadt and RE 7 Dessau-Berlin-Wünsdorf-Waldstadt.

In the immediate vicinity there is the airport Berlin-Schönefeld (SXF), which was extended to Berlin Brandenburg Airport (BER), which is not yet in operation. It will be reachable from Blankenfelde-Mahlow by train or car in fifteen minutes.

Twin towns – sister cities

Blankenfelde-Mahlow is twinned with:
 Bad Ems, Germany
 Kretinga, Lithuania
 Tószeg, Hungary

Notable people
Manfred Görg (1938–2012), Catholic theologian and egyptologist
Hans-Joachim Hacker (born 1949), politician (SPD)
Jan-Michael Feustel (1951–2009), art historian and author
Dietmar Klemt, politician (SPD), mayor and official director 1992–2003

References

 
Localities in Teltow-Fläming
Teltow (region)